Hamilton County Courthouse Complex is a historic courthouse complex located at Lake Pleasant in Hamilton County, New York.  The complex consists of three buildings: an 1848 Greek Revival style stone jail with 1940 stone addition, the 1929 brick courthouse, and county clerk's office building, also built in 1929.  The Colonial Revival style buildings replaced the original 1843 wood-frame courthouse and clerk's office.

It was added to the National Register of Historic Places in 1992.

Gallery

References

County courthouses in New York (state)
Courthouses on the National Register of Historic Places in New York (state)
Buildings and structures in Hamilton County, New York
National Register of Historic Places in Hamilton County, New York